The 1981 Bradley vs. Cincinnati men's basketball game is the longest NCAA Division I men's basketball game ever played and tied for the most overtime periods, regardless of NCAA classification, with seven. The University of Cincinnati visited Bradley University on December 21, 1981, and defeated them 75–73 after 75 minutes of game time. Little-used bench player Doug Schloemer scored on a 15-foot jump shot with one second remaining to propel the Bearcats to victory.

At the end of regulation, which was two 20-minute halves, the score was tied at 61 apiece. Both teams played keep-away throughout each overtime period; only once, during the fifth overtime, did a team take more than a two-point lead. In the 35 additional minutes of playing time, Cincinnati only scored 14 more points while Bradley only mustered 12. The shot clock had not yet been introduced in NCAA basketball. Nine players recorded 60 or more minutes of playing time. Two players—Bradley's center Donald Reese and Cincinnati's guard Bobby Austin—each played 73 minutes, jointly setting the NCAA all-time single game minutes played record.

Three other times has an NCAA Division I men's basketball game reached six overtime periods: Niagara defeated Siena 88–81 in 1953, Minnesota defeated Purdue 59–56 in 1955, and most recently Syracuse defeated Connecticut 127–117 in 2009.

References 

1981–82 Metro Conference men's basketball season
1981–82 Missouri Valley Conference men's basketball season
College basketball games in the United States
Bradley Braves men's basketball
Cincinnati Bearcats men's basketball
December 1981 sports events in the United States
1981 in sports in Illinois